Beaver Township is an active township in Taney County, in the U.S. state of Missouri.

Beaver Township was founded in 1837, taking its name from Beaver Creek.

References

Townships in Missouri
Townships in Taney County, Missouri